William C. Bartholomay (August 11, 1928 – March 25, 2020) was a successful Chicago business executive, who made his living in the insurance industry. In November 1962 at age 34, he was the leader of a consortium who bought the Major League Baseball (MLB) Milwaukee Braves — a franchise in the organization's National League (NL) — from Lou Perini 

Despite the Braves' success in Milwaukee, where the team had set league attendance records (after the franchise was moved from Boston) during the 1950s, Bartholomay was intent on moving the team to Atlanta, a growing regional center, where there was more television revenue, and where the new, 52,000-seat Atlanta Stadium had recently been built. He wanted to be the first man to bring a baseball team to the Deep South. Bartholomay worked with many civic leaders to help attain his dream. After an extended legal battle with Milwaukee that kept the Braves from moving through the 1965 season, and many death threats, the National League agreed to the shift to Atlanta. The case ultimately led to baseball's guidelines on local ownership.

In 1976, Bartholomay was approached with a business proposition by a friend, Ted Turner: The two knew that a baseball team and network deal would be a good way to market the Atlanta Braves on a national scale and provide programming for Turner's developing (TBS) network. Bartholomay agreed and sold the controlling interest of the team to Turner (of Turner Broadcasting System, Inc., and owner of CNN), while retaining his interest as chairman.

Bartholomay was a Life Trustee of Illinois Institute of Technology.

Family
William's father, Henry Bartholomay, was an executive at Alexander & Alexander, one of the largest insurance brokerages in the United States. His mother Virginia (nee Graves) drove for the Army Motor Corps in World War I and was active in the Red Cross during World War II. One of William's great-grandfathers, Henry Bartholomay, emigrated from Germany to Rochester, NY, where he established Bartholomay Brewing Company in 1874. Another great-grandfather, Conrad Seipp, founded the Conrad Seipp Brewing Company in Chicago.

Education 
Bartholomay is an alum of North Shore Country Day School and Lake Forest College.

Death
On March 25, 2020, Bartholomay died in New York-Presbyterian Hospital, New York City, of complications resulting from a respiratory illness, subsequent to a bout with pneumonia in December 2019. He was 91 years old.

References

External links
Bill Bartholomay at Baseball America Executive Database

1928 births
2020 deaths
20th-century American businesspeople
American businesspeople in insurance
Atlanta Braves owners
Atlanta Braves executives
Businesspeople from Chicago
Illinois Institute of Technology people
Major League Baseball owners
Major League Baseball executives
Major League Baseball team presidents
Milwaukee Braves owners
North American Soccer League (1968–1984) executives